Carrier Airborne Early Warning Squadron 126 (VAW-126), nicknamed the "Seahawks", is a carrier airborne early warning squadron of the United States Navy. The squadron is based at NS Norfolk, equipped with five E-2D Hawkeye aircraft.

Squadron history

1960s
VAW-126 was commissioned at NAS Norfolk, Virginia on 1April 1969. Originally nicknamed the "Closeouts", the squadron was equipped with four E-2A Hawkeye aircraft, assigned to Attack Carrier Air Wing 17 aboard the aircraft carrier . Following completion of their first deployment in July 1970, the squadron transitioned to the E-2B.

1970s
The squadron won the COMNAVAIRLANT Battle Readiness Efficiency "E" and the CNO Safety "S" Award in 1971. The squadron won the Battle "E" a second time in 1974.

Following their return to NAS Norfolk in October 1974, the squadron began its transition from the E-2B to the E-2C, Group0 variant.

In August 1975, the squadron began operations in the Caribbean Sea with CVW-9, based at NAS Miramar. In May 1976, they began the first of many trips moving the entire squadron back and forth between NAS Norfolk and NAS Miramar to operate with CVW-9 and prepare for their upcoming deployment aboard . The squadron made their second and final Western Pacific deployment with USS Constellation in May 1978.

The squadron changed their name to "Seahawks" in memory of their commanding officer, CDR Vady Clark, who died suddenly in September 1979.

The squadron joined  and CVW-1 upon returning to the East coast in 1979.

1980s
In July 1981, VAW-126 joined CVW-3, which replaced CVW-1 as the air wing deployed aboard USS John F. Kennedy. The September 1983 to May 1984 deployment was a record-breaking one for VAW-126; in addition to the 1983 Battle "E" they won both the COMNAVAIRLANT "Silver Anchor" award for superior retention and the Airborne Early Warning Excellence Award as the best VAW squadron in the Navy. The squadron departed for the Mediterranean aboard USS John F. Kennedy again in August 1986.

Upon their return in March 1987, the squadron participated in a variety of exercises including a MISSILEX off Brunswick, Maine and the VACAPES OPAREA, AEGIS support, along with drug interdiction operations. By November 1987 the squadron was back aboard USS John F. Kennedy in preparation for their next deployment. In 1988 the squadron was once again were awarded the COMNAVAIRLANT Battle "E," Meritorious Unit Commendation, and won the CVW-3 and CAEWWING-12 nomination for the Secretary of Defense Maintenance Excellence Award. In June, the Carrier Strike Group assembled for FLEETEX 2-88 and the squadron departed with USS John F. Kennedy in August for its 4th deployment on board.

1990s
The squadron's final deployment attached to USS John F. Kennedy was in August 1990 for Operations Desert Shield and Desert Storm. During both operations, the squadron accumulated over 2850 flight hours. On June 8, the squadron led a mixture of CVW-3 aircraft in a victory fly-by in Washington D.C.

The squadron was also awarded the 1994 Battle 'E' and the Airborne Early Warning Excellence award.

In November 1996, the squadron deployed to the Mediterranean in support of Bosnian and Adriatic Operations. While in the Adriatic they provided ABC2, AEW, and ES in support of NATO air operations. In November 1998, VAW-126 deployed aboard  for JTG 99-1. In its first few months, the squadron participated in Persian Gulf operations including Operation Desert Fox and Southern Watch. VAW-126 also participated in Juniper Stallion, INVITEX, and in Kosovo operations, transiting the Suez Canal four times during the deployment. The Carrier Battle Group wrapped up the deployment in the Persian Gulf and returned home 6May 1999.

From July to September 1999, VAW-126 participated in counter-narcotic operations, based out of NS Roosevelt Roads, Puerto Rico. The squadron, in cooperation with Joint Interagency Task Force, monitored and detected illegal drug suspects in the Caribbean. After returning from Puerto Rico, VAW-126 also assisted in air control for the massive search and rescue effort to rescue Hurricane Floyd survivors in North Carolina.

2000s

VAW-126 deployed on board the Navy's newest aircraft carrier at the time,  from November 2000 to May 2001. Their time was spent in the Mediterranean and Arabian Seas flying over 850 flight hours in support of Operation Southern Watch. Squadron maintenance crews earned two Golden Wrench Awards while deployed. Following deployment, the squadron spent several weeks at NS Roosevelt Roads supporting counter-narcotic operations in the region.

The squadron deployed aboard USS Harry S. Truman with CVW-3 in December 2002. The squadron flew 100 sorties and over 445 hours in support of Operation Iraqi Freedom. The squadron returned home to Norfolk in May 2003. In recognition of the year's accomplishments, the Seahawks were awarded the 2003 COMNAVAIRLANT Battle "E" as well as the 2003 RADM Frank Akers Award for Superior AEW Excellence.

In October 2004, VAW-126 deployed aboard USS Harry S. Truman to the Persian Gulf for a second deployment in support of Operation Iraqi Freedom. During this highly intensive combat cruise, the squadron flew 419 combat missions into Iraq, accumulating more than 2000 flight hours in support of the operation. In December 2004, the squadron sent two aircraft from the Persian Gulf to Afghanistan in support of Operation Enduring Freedom for the inauguration of the first democratically elected president. This was the first time the Seahawks supported two separate campaigns simultaneously. The squadron returned home in April 2005.After the combat cruise in April 2005, the squadron was constantly on the go supporting the Fleet Response Plan. In September 2005 the squadron was called into service to perform rescue and relief operations in response to Hurricane Katrina. With over 150 aircraft operating over the devastated Gulf Coast at any given time, rescuing survivors and delivering much-needed supplies, command and control were essential. VAW-126 provided the air coordination, staging out of NAS Pensacola, flying more than 46 sorties over a period of 18 days.

In early 2006, the squadron transitioned from the E-2C+ Group II aircraft to the E-2C Hawkeye 2000 (HE2K) platform, with improved systems and instrumentation. The new platform was soon tested in March when the squadron participated in a mini-SFARP (Strike Fighter Advanced Readiness Program) with VFA-106 and VFA-37 at NAS Key West, Florida. This exercise enabled the flight officers and pilots to familiarize themselves with the added capabilities of the HE2K in the air-to-air operational environment. In March 2006, the squadron was awarded both the CNAL Battle "E" Efficiency Award and the RADM Frank Akers "A" Award for AEW Excellence for CY 2005, effectively naming them as the finest Hawkeye squadron in naval aviation.

In December 2007 USS Harry S. Truman transited the Suez Canal and began flights in support of Operation Iraqi Freedom. The next four months included sustained operations over Iraq in support of U.S. Army, U.S. Marine Corps, and coalition personnel on the ground. In April 2008, increased insurgent activity in Basra, Iraq resulted in the squadron flying additional combat missions to provide command and control to coalition forces securing the city and ultimately defeating the uprising. Additionally, with a CEC-equipped cruiser or destroyer patrolling the northern Persian Gulf and acting as a relay node, the squadron was able to provide back to the strike group commander on Harry S. Truman in the central Persian Gulf a Single Integrated Air Picture (SIAP) extending as far north as Baghdad, Iraq. Combat operations ended for the squadron on April 29 as the strike group prepared for the transit home. The squadron made final port visits to Rhodes, Greece and Marseilles, France. After departing Marseilles, the squadron hosted and Harry S. Truman welcomed French Navy E-2C Hawkeyes for a day of carrier launch and recovery operations. The Seahawks returned home to NAS Norfolk on June 4, 2008.

2010s
VAW-126 completed a 2013-2014 Operation Enduring Freedom cruise with Carrier Air Wing 3 aboard USS Harry S. Truman flying the E-2C Nav Upgrade variant of the Hawkeye.

In March 2015, the squadron participated in Joint Exercise Green Flag 15-06 by providing airborne Command & Control for the Air Force's 548th Combat Training Squadron at Barksdale AFB. In August 2015 the squadron left CVW-3 and were assigned to Commander, Airborne Command, Control and Logistics Wing. In November 2015, the squadron participated in Joint Exercise Green Flag 16-02 by providing airborne command & control for the 548th Combat Training Squadron. In January 2016, the squadron began their transition to the E-2D Advanced Hawkeye platform. In January 2016, they were awarded the 2015 Medical Blue "M" Award.

See also
 History of the United States Navy
 List of United States Navy aircraft squadrons

References

External links
 VAW-126 Seahawks Homepage

Early warning squadrons of the United States Navy